The 1929 Currie Cup was the 16th edition of the Currie Cup, the premier domestic rugby union competition in South Africa.

See also

 Currie Cup

References

1929
1929 in South African rugby union
Currie